Rangamati Stadium is football stadium, located by the Hospital Rd, Rangamati, Bangladesh. In 2012, National Sports Council of Bangladesh recommended changing the name of Rangamati stadium to Ching Lah Mong Chowdhury Murruy Rangamati Stadium, to commemorat the late footballer Chinghla Mong Chowdhury Mari. The Stadium has been renamed to Rangamati Chinglah Moung Chowdhury (Mari) Stadium.

Hosting National Sporting Event 
The venue was the zonal host of 5th National Football Championship from September 15–26 in 2005.

See also
Stadiums in Bangladesh
List of football stadiums in Bangladesh
Football in Bangladesh

References

Rangamati Hill District
Football venues in Bangladesh